Eminence Township is an inactive township in Shannon County, in the U.S. state of Missouri.

Eminence Township was erected in 1842, taking its name from the community of Eminence, Missouri.

References

Townships in Missouri
Townships in Shannon County, Missouri